The 2007 Formula BMW USA season was the fourth season of the American Formula BMW championship for young drivers making the transition to car racing.  The Overall Championship was won by Daniel Morad as Esteban Gutiérrez was the highest classified rookie.

Teams and drivers
All cars were Mygale FB02 chassis powered by BMW engines.

Races

Standings 
Points were awarded as follows:

Drivers' Championship

References

External links
 BMW Group's press releases for Formula BMW USA
 Official Website
 BMW-Motorsport.com

Formula BMW seasons
Formula BMW
BMW USA